Lucía del Alba Carrillo Pariente (Madrid, July 31, 1986), better known as Alba Carrillo, is a Spanish model and television presenter, best known for her participation in the Supermodelo program in 2007. Her participation in the contest led her to be the image of Novissima, Eleonora Amadei, or Evelyny Marcelino, as well as for other brands such as Rosa Clará, Brownie, or Triumph. Subsequently, she signed with Mediaset España, where she became a presenter, collaborator, and participant in various television formats.

Biography

First years 
Born in Madrid, where she lived and grew up with her parents, Carlos Carrillo and Luca Pariente, Alba Carrillo studied Advertising and Public Relations at the Complutense University of Madrid, a career that she combined with courses in Dramatic Art. In the middle of this stage, she decided to apply for the television contest Supermodelo, broadcast on Cuatro and finished the course.

Professional career 
After her exit from the contest, she became the image of brands such as Novissima, Eleonora Amadei, and Evelyny Marcelino. Over the years, other important brands, such as Rosa Clará or Triumph, have worked with her as a model. After several years away from the television spotlight, she returned as the presenter of Glamour TV, directed by Ana García Siñeriz and broadcast on Nova. Two years later, she returned to the small screen as a contributor to Amigas y conocidas, the morning show on TVE.

In the summer of 2016, she presented, together with Rocío Carrasco, Sandra Barneda, Mónica Martínez and Soledad León de Salazar, the new season of Hable con ellas on Telecinco. After her time on the Mediaset España program, the model signed with the company to collaborate in spaces such as Sábado Deluxe, Sálvame, Viva la vida or Mujeres y hombres y viceversa. She has also participated in the reality show Supervivientes 2017 with her mother, where she finished in second place.

She has also participated in the competitions Ven a cenar conmigo: Gourmet Edition and Mi madre cocina mejor que la tuya, in addition to collaborating in Ya es mediodía, presented by Sonsoles Ónega. In September 2018, she makes her GH VIP debut and returns to the Emma García hosted program Viva la vida. On the occasion of the start of the new edition of Supervivientes, she begins to collaborate in the program Cuatro al día in 2019.

In terms of other projects, the model maintained a blog in Telva magazine for several years, where she commented on fashion and discussed various celebrities. On the other hand, she also launched her own clothing brand called "Coco y Cocoilo," designed for mothers and children. Later, she enrolled in Criminology, and in February 2019, she started studying at the University of Madrid.

In September 2019, she began her participation in GH VIP 7, where she qualified as second finalist. After collaborating in the program Ya es mediodía, she returned as a tertuliana to the program Sálvame in September 2021, though she would eventually leave the program two months later.

Private life 
Alba Carrillo began a relationship with ex-racer Fonsi Nieto in 2010, with whom she had a son, Lucas González Carrillo, on October 17, 2011. The relationship between the model and the ex-racer ended in 2012.

A year later, the presenter began a relationship with tennis player Feliciano López. After two years of dating, they decided to get married in 2015. However, in early 2016, the couple ended their relationship. The divorce was finalized in 2018.

Carrillo was romantically linked to engineer David Vallespín and footballer Thibaut Courtois between 2018 and 2019.

From 2019 to 2021, she maintained a relationship with journalist Santi Burgoa.

Filmography

Television programs 

 As a presenter

 As a collaborator

 As a guest

 As a participant

Television series

References

External links 
 Alba Carrillo on IMDb

Spanish female models
Living people
1986 births
Spanish television personalities